Bombshell is an album by King Creosote, released in 2007.

Regarding the album, Kenny Anderson states that:The new ones are pretty much my insecurities or paranoia of whatever I'm going through at this part of my life. I've got a daughter now, she's 8 and there's a song "Church as Witness" about a fall out she and I had, and yeah, there's others coming from a sort of older period in time just about all different things really. They are some comedy things on there. A lot of it I suppose is relationship based and then I suppose there's "You've No clue Do You?" which is a kind of a "who-done-it?" in the grand "Cluedo" tradition.

Track listing
Leslie
Home In A Sentence
You've No Clue Do You
Cowardly Custard
Church As Witness
There's None Of That
Nooks
Now Drop Your Bombshell
Admiral
Cockle Shell
Spystick
At The WAL
And The Racket They Made

References

2007 albums
King Creosote albums